Chris Taylor (born 25 August 1966) is a Canadian rower. He competed in the men's eight event at the 2000 Summer Olympics.

References

External links
 

1966 births
Living people
Canadian male rowers
Olympic rowers of Canada
Rowers at the 2000 Summer Olympics
Rowers from St. Catharines